The M50 is a dual two-lane motorway in Worcestershire, Gloucestershire, and Herefordshire, England. Sometimes referred to as the Ross Spur, it is a  connection of the M5 motorway to a point near Ross-on-Wye, where it joins the A40 road continuing westward into Wales. The motorway was fully opened in 1962.

Route
The M50 runs  between junction 8 of the M5 motorway,  NNE of Tewkesbury on the Gloucestershire-Worcestershire border; and
the junction with the A449, the A40 and the A465 ("Heads of the Valleys Road") taking traffic into South Wales.

Leaving the M5 at junction 8, it passes north of Tewkesbury then south of Ledbury. Between junctions 1 and 2 chiefly for these towns respectively, it crosses the River Severn on the Queenhill Bridge and Viaduct over the flood plain. After passing north of Newent, the motorway terminates at junction 4.

History

The construction works for the M50 were let under four contracts:

 Contract 1 was awarded to Tarmac Construction
 Contracts 2 and 3 were awarded to R M Douglas Construction
 Contract 4 was awarded to A E Farr Ltd

Both contracts were undertaken between 1958 and 1962:

On 3 March 1958, Harold Watkinson, the Minister of Transport and Civil Aviation fired a starting flare during the inauguration ceremony in Herefordshire to signal the start of construction of the M50. Junctions 1 to 4 opened in 1960 and the section between the M5 to junction 1 opened in 1962.

The route forms a strategic (that is, trunk or main) route from the Midlands and northern Britain to South Wales (also including the A449 and A40 and so was constructed as an early priority.) It is one of the few British motorways not to have been widened, instead retaining its original layout of two lanes in each direction.

Murder of Marie Wilks

In a high-profile case in 1988, a woman was abducted from the hard shoulder of the M50 and found murdered three miles further up the motorway. 22-year-old pregnant Marie Wilks, who had only passed her driving test two months earlier, had been driving with her two children when she accidentally drove onto the M50 after getting lost. Her car broke down on the eastbound carriageway and as she was using the emergency phone at the side of the road, she was abducted in sight of traffic. The telephone operator could then only hear the sound of passing traffic. Less than 10minutes later, a passing police car saw her two children walking up the hard shoulder, alone. The emergency phone was found dangling and blood was later found on the phone, while Marie was missing. Two days later, the woman's body was found three miles from the scene further up the eastbound carriageway. She had been left down the embankment and been stabbed in the left hand side of her throat, cutting the carotid artery. There was evidence that a car had driven onto the hard shoulder, then reversed behind the crash barrier.

An artists impression of a youthful-looking blonde man that was seen at the scene was released, which led to the arrest of similarly-looking Eddie Browning, a man that had driven from his home to Scotland in his silver Renault 25 after a row with his pregnant wife on the night of Marie’s murder. He was convicted at trial after it was found he had driven past Wilks on his journey, but he was released on appeal in 1994 after it was discovered that police had not disclosed a video in which an officer passing the scene was filmed four days before Browning's arrest under hypnosis. In the video the officer described seeing a sliver-grey non-metallic non-hatchback Renault car with chrome bumpers and the registration number C856 HFK. Browning's car was a hatchback Renault, with plastic bumpers, and the registration number C754 VAD. Browning died in 2018 and Wilks' murder is unsolved.

Junctions

Data from driver location signs are used to provide distance and carriageway identifier information.

{| class="wikitable"
|-  style="background:#0080d0; text-align:center; color:white; font-size:120%;"
| colspan="6" | M50 motorway junctions
|-
! mile
| km
! Eastbound exits (B carriageway)
! Junction
! Westbound exits (A carriageway)
! Coordinates
|- style="text-align:center;"
|0.0
|0.0
| The Midlands, Worcester, Birmingham, The South West, Tewkesbury, Bristol M5
| M5, J8Terminus
| Start of motorway
| 
|- style="text-align:center;"
|1.7
|2.8
| Tewkesbury A38
| J1
| Malvern A38
|
|- style="text-align:center;"
|10.9
|17.5
| Gloucester A417
| J2
| Ledbury A417
Hereford (A438)
|
|- style="text-align:center;"
|18.0
| 28.9
| Newent B4221
| J3
| Newent B4221
|
|- style="text-align:center;"
|21.6
|34.7
| Start of motorway
| J4Terminus
| South Wales, Monmouth, Ledbury, Ross-on-Wye A449
|

Services
After both ends of the M50 are motorway service stations:
Strensham services operated by RoadChef, north of the M50's northeastern terminus (unnamed, nominally 0) junction with junction 8 of the M5.
Esso garage on the combined short section of the A449 road and A40 remains westbound.

History
Instead of the latter, beyond junction 4 was a larger Ross Spur Services operated by Welcome Break which closed in the 2000s.

Descriptions
The starting junction (junction 8 of the M5) was originally a free-flowing trumpet-style, then converted to a roundabout with M5 flyover when the M5 was widened in the 1990s. Junction 1, where the M50 meets the A38, is a partial cloverleaf. Junction 2 has full slips roads from the deceleration lane into the slip roads save the kinked eastbound exit to local roads.  Junction 3 consists of dual-carriageway-style 90° exits due to cost, low traffic volume and the style of road; however this has been the scene of various accidents.

The long disused railway bridge over the motorway which carried the Tewkesbury and Malvern Railway was dismantled in 2012 and donated to the Bluebell Railway.

See also
List of motorways in the United Kingdom
Murder of Melanie Hall – another unsolved murder of a woman who, similarly to Marie Wilks, was found dead by the nearby and conjoining M5 motorway

References

External links

CBRD Motorway Database – M50
Motorway Archive – M50
Pathetic Motorways – M50

Motorways in England
Transport in Gloucestershire
Transport in Herefordshire
Roads in Worcestershire